Harry LeRoy Hawthorne (November 27, 1859 – April 10, 1948) was a Medal of Honor recipient.

Hawthorne was born in 1859 in Minnesota. He graduated from the United States Naval Academy in 1882, but after two years chose to take his commission in the United States Army. He distinguished himself at was then called the Battle of Wounded Knee, but now commonly called the Wounded Knee Massacre receiving the Medal of Honor. He made the Army a career, attending the Army War College and retiring as a colonel in 1914, and was recalled to serve during World War I.

Medal of Honor citation
Rank and organization. 2nd Lieutenant, 2nd U.S. Artillery. Entered service at: Kentucky. Birth: 1860, Minnesota. Place/Date: At Wounded Knee Creek, S. Dak., 29 December 1890. 

Citation:

Distinguished conduct in battle with hostile Indians.

See also

List of Medal of Honor recipients
List of Medal of Honor recipients for the Indian Wars
List of United States Naval Academy alumni (Medal of Honor)

References

External links

1860 births
1948 deaths
United States Army Medal of Honor recipients
Burials at Arlington National Cemetery
United States Naval Academy alumni
American Indian Wars recipients of the Medal of Honor
Pine Ridge Campaign